Grönköpings Veckoblad is a Swedish satirical monthly magazine. The name translates as "The Grönköping Weekly", or "The Greenville Weekly", Grönköping being a fictional Swedish town. The name Grönköping predates the magazine; it was first used by Albert Engström as a headline for some of his drawings in 1895.

History and profile
Founded in 1902 by Hasse Zetterström as a supplement to Söndags-Nisse, it became an independent magazine in 1916. As of 2008 the editor in chief  of the magazine was Ulf Schöldström. The magazine is based in Stockholm.

The parody language Transpiranto, a caricature of Esperanto, was introduced in a 1929 article by Nils Hasselskog,  "World language in Grönköping's school" ("Världsspråk i Grönköpings skola").

Grönköping has been characterized as a Sweden in miniature. Using bombastic and anachronistic language while purporting to describe and analyse current events in a serious manner, Grönköpings Veckoblad has become a Swedish institution and a standard for what is considered good satire.

The declared editorial stance is that they "always agree with the government, especially when they are wrong."

References

External links
 
 WorldCat record

1902 establishments in Sweden
Magazines established in 1902
Magazines published in Stockholm
Monthly magazines published in Sweden
Satirical magazines published in Sweden
Swedish humour
Swedish-language magazines
Swedish political satire